Jinyintan may refer to:

Jinyintan Hospital, hospital in Wuhan, Hubei, China
Jinyintan station, metro station in Wuhan, Hubei, China